Eladio Carlos Fernández Guillermo (born 25 April 1986 in Madrid, Spain), known as Eladio, is a Spanish professional goalkeeper.

Club career
Eladio started his senior career in the Spanish Segunda División B with Logroñés CF. He played also in the reserves team of Real Zaragoza, and with AD Alcorcón in the season of the stunning 4-0 defeat of giant Real Madrid in the 2009–10 King's Cup. Eladio would promote to the Spanish Segunda División with AD Alcorcón this year.

In 2011, he joined Badajoz, which he would soon leave due to the club's financial troubles. Thereafter, Eladio spent several months working with the
AFE team under the supervision of José Francisco Molina and playing a number of friendly games in China, in which his remarkable role would take him to SS Reyes. After just one season, Eladio signed with the Glyfada F.C. in the Greek second division.

References

External links
CD Badajoz profile

1986 births
Living people
Footballers from Madrid
Spanish footballers
Association football forwards
Segunda División B players
AD Alcorcón footballers
UD San Sebastián de los Reyes players
Spanish expatriate footballers